The Victoria's Secret Fashion Show is an annual fashion show sponsored by Victoria's Secret, a brand of lingerie and sleepwear. Victoria's Secret uses the show to promote and market its goods in high-profile settings. The show features some of the world's leading fashion models, such as current Victoria's Secret Angels Tyra Banks, Heidi Klum, Gisele Bündchen, Adriana Lima, Karolína Kurková, Alessandra Ambrosio, Selita Ebanks, and Izabel Goulart.

The Victoria's Secret Fashion Show 2005 was recorded in New York City, United States at the 69th Regiment Armory. The show featured musical performances by Chris Botti, Seal, and Ricky Martin. Gisele Bündchen was wearing the Victoria's Secret Fantasy Bra : Sexy Splendor Fantasy Bra worth $12,500,000.

Fashion Show segments

Segment 1: Sexy Santa Helpers

Segment 2: Sexy Shadow Dreams

Segment 3: Sexy Crystal Princesses

Segment 4: Sexy Delicious 
This segment was swapped in order of appearance with the fifth segment, Sexy Russian Babes, in the edited TV version.

Segment 5: Sexy Russian Babes 
This segment was swapped in order of appearance with the fourth segment, Sexy Delicious, in the edited TV version.

Special Performance

Segment 6: Sexy Toys

Finale

Tyra Banks led the finale.

Index

Victoria's Secret
2005 in fashion